General Zubair Mahmood Hayat  (born 1960) is a retired four-star rank army general of the Pakistan Army who served as the 16th Chairman Joint Chiefs of Staff Committee from 28 November 2016 until his retirement on 27 November 2019.

Biography

Zubair Mahmood Hayat was born into a military family, and his father, Mohammad Aslam Hayat, served in the Pakistan Army, retiring as a major-general. After graduating from a local high school, Hayat joined the Pakistan Army in 1978, and entered in the Pakistan Military Academy in Kakul where he passed out with a class of 62nd PMA Long Course from the PMA Kakul in 1980.

Hayat gained a commission as 2nd-Lt. in the 3rd (SP) Medium, Artillery Corps on 24 October 1980.

Lt. Hayat was further trained as a forward observer at the U.S. Army's Field Artillery School in Fort Sill, Oklahoma, United States, where he qualified and graduated as an artillery specialist. In the United Kingdom, he attended the Staff College in Camberley, United Kingdom, and is a graduate of the National Defence University in national security coursework. In 2000–2001, Lieutenant-Colonel Hyatt commanded the infantry regiment during the times of military tension between India and Pakistan.

In 2002–04, Colonel Hayat was posted by the Ministry of Defence on a diplomatic assignment, serving as a military and air attaché at the High Commission of Pakistan in London, United Kingdom. In 2004–07, Col. Hayat was later posted as a defence attaché at the Embassy of Pakistan in Washington, D.C., United States.

In 2007, Col. Hayat was promoted to one-star army general, and moved to the Army GHQ after being recalled to Pakistan. Subsequently, Brigadier Hayat was appointed as Chief of Staff to the Chief of Army Staff's office, where he served until 2010. In 2010–12, Brig. Hayat was promoted to the two-star rank; Major-General Hayat was appointed as a GOC of the 15th Infantry Division, stationed in Sialkot Cantt.

In 2013, Lieutenant-General Hayat was elevated as a field commander of the XXXI Corps, stationed in Bahawalpur but this appointment remained short-lived. In December 2013, he was appointed as Director-General of the Strategic Plans Division Force (SPD Force), which is responsible for providing protection to the country's nuclear arsenals.

In 2015, Lt-Gen. Hayat was again posted at the Army GHQ and appointed as the Chief of General Staff under army chief General Raheel Sharif.

Chairman joint chiefs

In 2016, Prime Minister Sharif confirmed the timely retirement of Chairman Joint Chiefs General Rashad Mahmood, while General Raheel Sharif dismissed rumours of seeking the extension for his term.

Initially, the race for the appointment for the army chief was rumored to be between Lt-Gen. Hayat and Lt-Gen. Javed Ramday who was close to the first family. At the time of this promotion, Lt-Gen. Hayat was the most senior military officer in the military, and Prime Minister Sharif announced to appoint him as the Chairman Joint Chiefs.

On 28 November 2016, Prime Minister Sharif announced the appointment of the junior-most General Javed Bajwa as the chief of army staff, superseding two senior army generals who were retired from their respective military services.

In 2016, Gen. Hayat was awarded with Nishan-e-Imtiaz (Military).

In March 2019, at a conference organised by the Pakistan Institute for Conflict and Security Studies (PICSS), in collaboration with the Institute of Business Administration (IBA), Center for Entrepreneurial Development (CED), Karachi, he categorically underlined the historical foundation of Pakistan in Mehrgarh, and the mistakes made by United States in Afghanistan, in his key note address.

Reception and family background

In Pakistan's news media, Hayat is rumored to have been gifted with an eidetic memory, and a sharp reader.

Zubair Mahmood Hayat is born into a military family, and his father, Mahmood Aslam Hayat, briefly served in the Pakistan Army, retiring as a major-general. He has also served as PSO to General Ashfaq Parvez Kayani. His younger brother, Lt-Gen. O.M. Hyatt, had briefly served as chairman of the Pakistan Ordnance Factories (POF) before being transferred and posted at the National Disaster Management Authority (NDMA) while his youngest sibling, Ahmad Mahmood Hayat served as a Director General in the Inter-Services Intelligence (ISI).

Awards and decorations

Foreign decorations

See also
Indo-Pakistani relations
India-Pakistan military confrontation (2016-present)

References

External links
Chairman Joint Chiefs

|-
 

 

1960s births
Punjabi people
People from Lahore
Pakistan Military Academy alumni
Pakistani expatriates in the United States
Graduates of the Staff College, Camberley
National Defence University, Pakistan alumni
Pakistani diplomats
Pakistani military attachés
Pakistani generals
Chairmen Joint Chiefs of Staff Committee
Recipients of Nishan-e-Imtiaz
Living people